Mønin  is a mountain  located in the municipality of Ål in  Buskerud, Norway.

External links
Mønin coord

Ål
Mountains of Viken